British Leyland UK Ltd v Swift [1981] IRLR 91 is a UK labour law case, concerning unfair dismissal, now governed by the Employment Rights Act 1996.

Facts
Mr Swift was dismissed when one of the company's car's tax discs was found in his vehicle. Mr Swift was convicted of a crime, and the employer dismissed him. Mr Swift claimed the dismissal was unfair.

The Tribunal found that Mr Swift was guilty of gross misconduct but the dismissal was unfair because it was too severe a penalty for years of good service.

Judgment
Lord Denning MR held that the decision was perverse and would be reversed. He noted the tribunal said:

However, Lord Denning MR said the Tribunal did not take account of the fact that Swift did not come clean when he was found out, and he lied about what he had done. A reasonable employer could have dismissed him.

See also
 British Leyland Motor Corp. v. Armstrong Patents Co.

Notes

United Kingdom labour case law
House of Lords cases
1981 in case law
1981 in British law
British Leyland